Aradite is a very rare mineral with formula BaCa6[(SiO4)(VO4)](VO4)2F. Aradite and its phosphorus-analogue, zadovite, were found in paralavas (rocks formed due to pyrometamorphism) of the Hatrurim Formation. Both aradite and zadovite have structures similar to that of nabimusaite. Structure of all three minerals is related to that of hatrurite.

References

Silicate minerals
Vanadate minerals
Calcium minerals
Barium minerals
Trigonal minerals
Minerals described in 2015